The 1873 Bath by-election was fought on 8 October 1873.  The byelection was fought due to the Death of the incumbent MP of the Liberal Party, Donald Dalrymple.  It was won by the Liberal candidate Arthur Hayter.

References

1873 in England
Politics of Bath, Somerset
1873 elections in the United Kingdom
By-elections to the Parliament of the United Kingdom in Somerset constituencies
19th century in Somerset